Karen Valencia Clark Sheard (née Clark; born November 15, 1960) is an American Grammy Award–winning Gospel singer, musician, songwriter, and businesswoman. Clark-Sheard is the wife of the current Church of God in Christ Presiding Bishop J. Drew Sheard and she serves as the current First Lady of the COGIC denomination. Clark–Sheard is the youngest member of gospel group the Clark Sisters. She is also the mother of contemporary gospel singer and actress Kierra "Kiki" Sheard. She has released five solo albums, seventeen with the Clark Sisters, and collaborated with her son J. Drew Sheard II and her daughter Kierra Sheard.

During the hiatus of the Clark Sisters, Clark–Sheard recorded her critically acclaimed solo album Finally Karen, which spawned her hit, "Balm in Gilead" (a re-recording of a song she originally recorded as part of the Clark Sisters in the 1980s for their Heart & Soul album) the R&B-flavored "Just For Me" and "Nothing Without You" – a contemporary duet with R&B diva Faith Evans. Finally Karen became one of the most successful gospel albums of 1998 earning Sheard a Grammy nomination and a Soul Train Lady of Soul Award for "Best Female Vocalist".

After her debut album and touring, Clark–Sheard was hospitalized in 2001 after a blood vessel burst during a cosmetic procedure, resulting in doctors giving her a 2% chance of survival. The experience inspired the title for her second album, 2nd Chance, released in 2002. Clark–Sheard recorded two more live albums, including The Heavens Are Telling and It's Not Over (which featured some studio recordings), before releasing All in One, Clark–Sheard's first all-studio-recorded album in 13 years. The album debuted at #2 on the U.S. Billboard Gospel Chart and #98 on Billboards Top 200 albums chart, while its first single "Prayed Up" peaked at #9 on the U.S. Billboard Gospel Songs chart.

Singers Beyoncé and Mariah Carey count Karen Clark-Sheard as one of their vocal influences.

Biography
Early life and education
Clark–Sheard was born Karen Valencia Clark''' on November 15, 1960, in Detroit, Michigan, the youngest child of Reverend Elbert Clark and Dr. Mattie Moss Clark, a gospel choral director. The youngest of six children, Clark–Sheard's siblings are Leo, Jacky, Denise, Elbernita "Twinkie" and Dorinda. Clark–Sheard began singing gospel with her sisters at age 5 in what became known as the Clark Sisters. For high school, Clark-Sheard attended Mumford High School in Detroit, Michigan, graduating in 1978.

Career
The Clark Sisters

Debut album

Clark–Sheard's involvement in the Island Inspirational All Stars' "Don't Give Up" in 1996 (along with Donald Lawrence, Hezekiah Walker, and Kirk Franklin) led to her signing with Island Records. Clark–Sheard's solo career began with the release of her debut album Finally Karen in 1997. The album, consisting of half studio recordings and half live recordings, was nominated for a Grammy Award for Best Contemporary Soul Gospel Album in 1998, won Clark-Sheard the Lady of Soul award for Best Gospel Album that same year and peaked at #28 and #2 on the U.S. Billboard Top R&B/Hip-Hop Albums and U.S. Billboard Gospel Albums charts respectively.
2nd Chance

After Yolanda Adams, Clark-Sheard became the 2nd gospel artist to sign to Elektra Records. She released her Elektra debut album 2nd Chance in 2002 (so named because of the "second chance" she was given by God after her near-death experience – which is referenced in her daughter Kierra's song "You Don't Know"). The album was led off by the single "Be Sure". The album reached #82 on the U.S. Billboard 200, #27 on the U.S. Billboard Top R&B/Hip-Hop Albums chart (her highest chartings on those charts to date) and #2 on the U.S. Billboard Gospel Albums.
The Heavens Are Telling

The 2003 followup The Heavens Are Telling (exactly six years after her heralded debut album Finally Karen) came when Elektra Records was being dissolved into Atlantic Records, and failed to match the commercial success of Clark-Sheard's previous albums, peaking 106 places below 2nd Chance at #188 on the U.S. Billboard 200 – though it managed to reach #44 on the U.S. Billboard Top R&B/Hip-Hop Albums, a high #3 on the U.S. Billboard Gospel Albums chart and was her first album to chart on the U.S. Billboard Christian Albums chart, where it peaked at #11.

It's Not Over

In 2005, after a bidding war with several labels, Clark-Sheard signed with Word Records and issued It's Not Over (originally titled Finally Karen Returns), the sequel to her 1997 debut album Finally Karen was set to be released November 15, 2005, Clark-Sheard's 45th birthday, but was delayed and released the following year. Most of It's Not Over was recorded in 2005 at Karen's home church in Detroit, Michigan, while the last three tracks were studio-recorded. 

It was Clark-Sheard's first solo album not to feature guest vocals from her daughter (Kierra Sheard) and was the first to include production from Israel Houghton – who handled the majority of the project. It charted at #124 on the U.S. Billboard 200 and #4 on the U.S. Billboard Top R&B/Hip-Hop Albums. As the songwriter, on February 10, 2008, Clark-Sheard won the Grammy Award for Best Gospel Song for "Blessed & Highly Favored" sung by the Clark Sisters.
Karew Records, 5th album and present

In early 2009, Clark-Sheard and her husband, J.Drew Sheard, partnered together and launched a new record label entitled Karew Records (Karew being a combination of both their forenames: Karen and Drew, pronounced: Kuh-rue); Distribution is via EMI Gospel. The Clark Sisters' Christmas album – which was released in October 2009 – was the first project to be released from Karew Records.

On January 31, 2010, Clark-Sheard won the Grammy Award for Best Gospel Performance for Wait on the Lord which she was featured with Donnie McClurkin. On April 6, 2010, Clark-Sheard released her fifth album (and first on her newly founded own record label – Karew Records) titled All in One, which features additional vocals from her daughter Kierra Sheard, son J. Drew Sheard II, sister Dorinda Clark Cole, niece Angel Chisholm and cousin J. Moss. Her first all-studio-recorded album since her 2002 release 2nd Chance, All in One debuted and peaked at #98 on the U.S. Billboard 200 (her second highest charting on that chart to date) and #3 on the U.S. Billboard Gospel Albums chart, while the album's lead single – "Prayed Up" – peaked at #9 and stayed over 22 weeks on the U.S. Billboard Hot Gospel Songs chart. Clark-Sheard released her latest single "Sunday A.M" in 2014, which was nominated for the Best Gospel Song in the 57th Annual Grammy Awards.

In 2015, Clark-Sheard released her 6th album, Destined to Win. The album would become Clark-Sheard's highest charting and fastest selling album in her solo career, as well as her first live album since It's Not Over in 2006.

In 2019, Clark-Sheard was in talks to play Kitty Parham, a member of the Famous Ward Singers in Aretha Franklin's biopic Respect.

Karen was portrayed by her daughter, Kierra Sheard in the Lifetime TV biopic The Clark Sisters: First Ladies of Gospel, released April 11, 2020.

Personal life
Marriage and family
Clark-Sheard married Bishop J. Drew Sheard, a Detroit-based minister, on June 16, 1984. Clark-Sheard serves as the First Lady of Greater Emmanuel Institutional Church of God in Christ in Detroit, where her husband is senior pastor. In March 2021, Bishop Sheard was elected to serve as the Presiding Bishop of the COGIC denomination, thus making her the First Lady of the COGIC denomination at-large as well. Together they have two children: Kierra "Kiki" Sheard-Kelly (1987) and John Drew "J. Drew" Sheard II (1989). Another pregnancy ended in a stillbirth. Kiki is also a gospel recording artist, with four albums, plus various projects to her credit. J. Drew is a musician and producer who often plays drums for the Clark Sisters.

Health
In 2001, Clark-Sheard was faced with a life-threatening crisis when a blood vessel burst during a scheduled bariatric surgery. Her doctors only gave her a 2% chance of survival due to her complications. After the blood clot was surgically removed, Clark-Sheard fell into a coma. The coma lasted 6 months , but Clark-Sheard says she made a miraculousChristian Music Planet recovery.

Tours and concerts
(1989) The Clark Sisters: Bringing It Back Home
(1997) Finally Karen
(2007-2008) The Clark Sisters: Live One Last Time Tour
(2016-2017) Festival Of Praise
(2016-2017) McDonald's Celebration of Gospel
 (2020) The Clark Sisters Virtual Experience

Filmography
1983 Gospel (documentary)
2009 "Stellar Awards" (Donnie McClurkin)
2010 Blessed & Cursed (movie)
2010 "BET Awards"(All Star)
2010 "Trumpet Awards" (The Clark Sisters)
2011 "Stellar Awards" ( Kirk Franklin tribute)
2011–2012 Church Girl (stage play)
2012 For Richer or Poorer (stage play)
2012 "BMI Urban Music Awards" (Mariah Carey tribute)
2013 "The Sheards"
2013 "BET Celebration of Gospel"
2014 "The BET Honors"
2017 "Xscape: Still Kickin It" (Xscape Rocks the Stage, Episode 4)
2020 The Clark Sisters: First Ladies of Gospel (movie)
2021 Miracles Across 125th Street2021 Song and Story: Amazing GraceDiscography

Compilations
2011: The Ultimate Collection – compilation

Studio albums
Jul. 2002: 2nd Chance
Nov. 2003: The Heavens Are Telling
Jan. 2006: It's Not Over
Apr. 2010: All in One

Live albums

Nov. 1997: Finally Karen
Jul. 2015: Destined to Win

Awards

BET Awards

The BET Awards are awarded annually by the Black Entertainment Television network. Karen Clark Sheard has received 3 nominations.

Dove Awards

The Dove Awards are awarded annually by the Gospel Music Association. The Clark Sisters have won 2 awards from 8 nominations.

Grammy Awards

The Grammy Awards are awarded annually by the National Academy of Recording Arts and Sciences. Karen Clark Sheard has won 4 awards from 13 nominations.

NAACP Image Awards

The NAACP Image Awards are awarded annually by the National Association for the Advancement of Colored People (NAACP). Clark Sheard has won 2 awards from 4 nominations.

Soul Train Awards
The Soul Train Music Awards are awarded annually. Karen Clark Sheard has won 1 award from 5 nominations.

Stellar Awards
The Stellar Awards are awarded annually by SAGMA. Karen Clark Sheard has received 12 awards and 1 honorary award.

References

External links
Official website of the Clark Sisters

Grammy Award winners
Singers from Detroit
21st-century American singers
20th-century American singers
1960 births
Living people
American gospel singers
African-American women singers
Members of the Church of God in Christ
American Pentecostals
African-American Christians
20th-century American women singers
21st-century American women singers